The Dai Ichi Daihoumaru Ship Incident (Japanese: 第一大邦丸事件, Dai Ichi Daihoumaru jiken) refers to an incident where the South Korean Coast Guard shot and killed Seto Jujiro (瀬戸 重次郎), the head fisherman of the Japanese ship Dai Ichi Daihoumaru on February 4, 1952. Below is a translation of the Japanese narrative of the incident.

"On January 22, 1953, two fishing vessels respectively named Daiichi Daihou Maru and Daini Daihou Maru of Taihou Fisheries Company left Fukuoka, Japan for fishing operations. By February 4, they arrived at No. 284 fishing zone in international waters near Jeju Island."

"When two Japanese fishing vessels operating in the designated fishing zone at around 7:00 a.m. the same day, two S. Korean fishing vessels (第一昌運号제 2 장 운 호and第二昌運号제 2 장 운 호) were spotted approaching the Japanese fishing vessels. They soon came close to the Japanese fishing vessels. And, then S. Korean crews greeted Japanese crews by saying “How’s your fishing going today?” They just passed by and stopped nearby, watching the Japanese fishing vessels."

"As soon as Daiichi Daihou Maru began pulling fishing net up, the S. Korean vessels (in fact disguised as the fishing vessels manned by military personnel, etc.) at the distance of 30 meters from the stern of the Japanese fishing vessels opened firing automatic rifles at Daiichi Daihou Maru. Two Japanese fishing vessels were trying to escape their sudden and vicious attack on them but both of them were soon captured by 8:30 a.m. since the South Koreans were intensely and fiercely firing at them."

"One of chief fishermen was hit in the head with a bullet fired from one of the automatic rifles and fell unconscious. Then, they told Daiichi Daihou Maru and Daiini Daihou Maru to head to Jeju Island. They arrived at Hanlin port, Jeju Island at 11:30 a.m. The Japanese crews were transferred to the S. Korean police authority that soon confiscated private belongings, properties, equipment, etc. When at the police authority, the Japanese crews told them that one of their crews was seriously injured. He was then taken to a hospital which one could hardly call "hospital" since it had no wards, equipment, instruments, etc. A Korean doctor just refused to extend any medical care to him. The Japanese fishing crews requested the police authority to find a hospital for him but they just rejected their request by stating “We are just carrying out our duty in accordance with an order given by the military. Therefore, we have no responsibility.” Then, they requested the military to extend necessary medical care to him. However, the military again refused to do so."

"They repeatedly requested the military to hospitalize him at the military hospital. They even told them that they would pay for medical expenses. Then, they pretended to accept their request and told them “They would soon transport him to the military hospital by car.” However, he was just left alone there. He died at 23:00 p.m. on February 6."

"The Japanese crews requested the police authority to cremate dead Chief fisherman. However, it was turned down. They had to improvise his funeral service and materials to cremate him all by themselves."

"On February 9, they were transferred to an air defense facility in which they were confined in a small room whose floor area was 8.25 square meters. 18 crews were confined there with no food supplied by them. They had to survive on limited foods they had with them."

"During police interrogation, the S. Korean police authority insisted that two Japanese fishing vessels were captured 9 nautical miles from Hanlin, Jeju Island. On the other hand, the Japanese crews pointed out not only inaccuracy of navigational compass but also speed of the Korean vessels and then insisted that it was 30 nautical miles at the time of capture. Then, the South Korean police authority forced them to accept 13 nautical miles close to halfway between the Japanese claim and the Korean claim. According to a navigator of Daiichi Daihou Maru separately questioned by the South Korean police authority, two Japanese vessels were 30 nautical miles from Jeju Island when they were captured."

"At 23:00 p.m. on the same day, they were transferred to the police station at Jeju City and were jailed at the prison cell without any meal at all. The prison cell was only 8.25 square meters. 18 crews were jailed together with Korean inmates at a very small cell. However, some meager meals were served there."

"The Japanese crews were again interrogated by the Jeju police. The Jeju police charged the Japanese crews with violation of Syngman Rhee Line. They refuted the South Korean claim by telling them that installation of the line encompassing the island of Takeshima and a large area of water with fisheries jurisdiction was a unilateral act in contravention of international law."

"The police prepared an investigator’s record of oral statement in Hangul, in which the police falsified the statement as saying that the Japanese crews violated Syngman Rhee Line. The police told them to sign the falsified statement written in Hangul and informed the Government of Japan to the effect that they admitted violation of Syngman Rhee Line."

"A U.S. Navy representative met with South Korean pres. Syngman over the incident. Syngman expressed his regrets over abduction of the Japanese fishermen in international waters. Two fishing vessels and crews were returned home guarded by U.S Navy Frigate ship on February 17".

"When leaving South Korea, the South Korean police stated: “We are very sorry for death of your crew. Since our country is at war, we couldn’t afford to give you foods even if we wanted to. Please do not say anything bad about the police.”"

"Major Issues of the Incident described above:"

"Installation of Syngman Rhee Line encompassing the island of Takeshima and a large area of water with fisheries jurisdiction is a unilateral act in contravention of international law. 
Firing at the civilian ships without warnings in international waters is a crime. 
Premeditated criminal act committed by the government of South Korea to pursue its military purpose of illegally occupying the large area of water and Takeshima as evidenced in the fact that each Korean vessel was staffed with 1 military police, 1 specially trained soldier, 1 information officer, 4 police officers in addition to 12 crews. 
Serious human rights violation by abusing the Japanese crews during interrogations. ex. Refusal to offer medical care, Refusal to supply foods, Refusal to carry out funeral service and cremation, Confinement of the Japanese crews at overcrowded cell whose floor area is less than  8.25 square meters, etc."

"The above is just a beginning of brutal killings and abduction of the Japanese fishermen by the government of South Korea."

"During the period of January 18, 1952 (date of unilateral installation of Syngman Rhee Line) to June 22, 1965 (signing date of Treaty on Basic Relations between Japan and the Republic of Korea), 328 Japanese fishing vessels were captured and 3,929 fishermen were abducted by South Korea. And, 44 Japanese fishermen were killed by South Korea."

See also
Liancourt Rocks
Syngman Rhee line
Korean-Japanese disputes
Tsushima Island

External links

 第15回国会　水産・法務・外務連合委員会　第１号 昭和二十八年二月二十三日（月曜日）

1952 crimes in Asia
Japan–South Korea relations
Anti-South Korean sentiment in Japan
Anti-Japanese sentiment in South Korea
Diplomatic correspondence
Murder in Japan
1952 in Japan
Liancourt Rocks
Fishing conflicts